Hoppel poppel is an alcoholic beverage, associated with the Netherlands, made with egg yolks, milk, cognac or rum, sugar, nutmeg and vanilla.

Hoppel poppel can be served cold or hot.

See also 
 Kogel mogel
 Zabaione
 List of cocktails

References 

Cocktails with brandy
Cocktails with eggs
Cocktails with rum
Creamy cocktails
Cocktails with milk